Dehnowiyeh (also Romanized as Dehnow’īyeh; also known as Deh Now) is a village in Sarbanan Rural District, in the Central District of Zarand County, Kerman Province, Iran. At the 2006 census, its population was 84, in 21 families.

References 

Populated places in Zarand County